Heera Mandi (Urdu and ), sometimes referred to as Shahi Mohallah ("Royal Neighbourhood"), is a neighbourhood and bazaar located in the Walled City of Lahore. It is specifically known as the red light district of Lahore, Pakistan.

It is named after Hira Singh  Emperor who established a food grain market in Shahi Mohallah, which later got the name 'Hira Singh Di Mandi', meaning Hira Singh's food grain market. This later got transformed to the modern name Heera Mandi.

It is located inside the Walled City of Lahore, near the Taxali Gate, and south of the Badshahi Mosque. The market had historically been the centre of the city's refined tawaif culture since the 15th and 16th centuries.

Etymology
The area's name is traditionally described on heera singh son of Dhian Singh Dogra who was the Prime Minister of Maharaja Ranjit Singh.

Historical background
The market was originally the centre of the city's tawaif (concubine) culture for the Lahore's Mughal era elite during the 15th and 16th centuries. It was opened by Mughals who brought women mainly from all parts of India to savor the dances and entertainment they provided. Later, some women from other parts of Indian Subcontinent were also brought to perform classical Indian dances such as Kathak to entertain Mughals.

Heera Mandi became first associated with prostitution during the invasion of Ahmad Shah Abdali. His troops set up brothels with the women they had captured from the towns and cities they sacked during their invasion of the Subcontinent.

British colonial rule solidified Heera Mandi's reputation as a hub for prostitution. Within the market, women and khwajasara (transgenders) offered traditional and classical dances. From the British colonial period till the past few years, it remained a centre of prostitution in Lahore. Many Hijras, members of Pakistan's transgender community, frequent the area and are involved in the area's dance culture.

Prostitution
The brothel houses were further developed by the British in old Anarkali Bazaar for the recreation of the British soldiers during the British Raj. After that these were shifted to Lohari Gate and then to Taxali Gate. After 1947, many governments have made efforts to increase amenities for customers of prostitution at the Heera Mandi area of Lahore but have failed.

During the day, Heera Mandi is much like any other Pakistani bazaar and is known for its good food, wide range of Khussa (traditional Mughal footwear), and shops for musical instruments and dance. At night, the brothels above the shops open. The place is also considered as a symbol for the city of Lahore and sometimes the words 'Heera Mandi' themselves are considered to be offensive informal talks.

Crackdown on Prostitution
During Muhammad Zia-ul-Haq's reign, an operation was conducted against music and dance houses, which were alleged to be dens of prostitution. The operation served to spread the practice throughout the city. In recent times, the area has become known for prostitution again, though the practice in the neighbourhood is in decline with the rise of online escort services.

Civic administration
The neighbourhood forms part of Taxali Gate's Union Council 30.

Cultural portrayal
Heera Mandi is referred to in the Bollywood movie Kalank.

See also

 Dance bar
 Mujra
 Nautch
 Tawaif
 Prostitution in colonial India 
 Prostitution in Pakistan

References

Further reading

*

H
Gay villages in Pakistan
Walled City of Lahore
Ravi Zone
Populated places in Lahore District
Hijra (South Asia)